Norman Komani is a retired Zimbabwean football striker.

References

Year of birth missing (living people)
Living people
Zimbabwean footballers
Zimbabwe international footballers
Amazulu F.C. (Zimbabwe) players
Association football forwards